Tajudeen Sabitu (born 24 October 1964) is a Nigerian boxer. He competed in the men's welterweight event at the 1992 Summer Olympics.

References

1964 births
Living people
Nigerian male boxers
Olympic boxers of Nigeria
Boxers at the 1992 Summer Olympics
Place of birth missing (living people)
Welterweight boxers